Jon Tyson Thomas (born 1967) is a retired lieutenant general in the United States Air Force, who last served as deputy commander of Pacific Air Forces from 2020 to 2021. From Huntington Beach, California, Thomas was commissioned after graduating from the United States Air Force Academy in 1989.

Awards and decorations

Effective dates of promotions

References

1967 births
United States Air Force personnel of the Gulf War
Harvard Kennedy School alumni
Living people
Recipients of the Air Force Distinguished Service Medal
Recipients of the Defense Superior Service Medal
Recipients of the Legion of Merit
United States Air Force Academy alumni
United States Air Force generals
Air War College alumni